The Diocese of Vicenza is a Roman Catholic ecclesiastical territory in Italy.

Among its patron saints, the city venerates St. Lontius, bishop and martyr, and St. Theodore and St. Apollonius, bishops and confessors in the fourth century. The Christian cemetery was discovered near the Church of Sts. Felix and Fortunatus date from the earlier half of the fourth century, and these two saints were probably martyred under Diocletian.

History

The first bishop of whom there is any certain record is Horontius (590), a partisan of the Schism of the Three Chapters. Other bishops were: Vitalis (901), high chancellor of King Berengar of Ivrea; Girolamo (1000), deposed by Emperor Henry II for political sedition; Torengo, in whose episcopate a number of bishops rebelled against the episcopal authority. Uberto was deposed by Pope Innocent III as a despoiler of church property, but the canons put off until 1219 the election of his successor, Gilberto, who was forced by the tyranny of Ezzelino to live in exile.

Under Bishop Emiliani (1409) took place the alleged apparition of the Blessed Virgin on Monte Berico which led to the foundation of the famous sanctuary. Pietro Barbo (1451) was afterwards elected Pope Paul II.

Cardinal Giovanni Battista Zeno (1468) was distinguished for his sanctity and learning. Matteo Priuli (1563) founded the seminary and made efforts for reform. Alvise M. Ganrielli (1779) restored many churches and the seminary.

The See of Vicenza was suffragan of Aquileia, then of Udine, and since 1818 of Venice. The diocese had circa 1900: 219 parishes, with 477,000 souls; 699 secular and 39 regular priests; 10 houses of male religious and 52 sisters; 4 schools for boys, and 52 for girls. The Catholic Press comprised "Il Berico" (tri- weekly, Vicenza), "La Riscossa" (tri-weekly, Breganze), and six other periodicals.

Bishops 
 Rinaldo da Concorezzo (1296–1303) -appointed Archbishop of Ravenna-Cervia
Pietro Filargis, O.F.M. (1388–1389 Appointed Bishop of Novara)
... 
Francesco Malipiero, O.S.B. (1433–1451 Died) 
Pietro Barbo (1451–1464 Elected Pope) 
Marco Barbo (1464–1470 Appointed Patriarch of Aquileia) 
Giovanni Battista Zeno (1470–1501 Died) 
Pietro Dandolo (1501–1507 Appointed Bishop of Padua) 
Galeotto Franciotti della Rovere (1507–1507 Died) 
Sisto Gara della Rovere (Franciotti) (1507–1508 Appointed Bishop of Camerino) 
Francesco della Rovere (1509–1514 Appointed Bishop of Volterra) 
Francesco Soderini (1514–1524 Resigned) 
Niccolò Ridolfi (1524–1550 Died) 
Angelo Bragadino, O.P. (1550–1560 Died) 
Giulio della Rovere (1560–1565 Resigned) 
Matteo Priuli (1565–1579 Resigned) 
Michele Priuli (1579–1603 Died) 
Giovanni Delfino (1603–1606 Resigned) 
Denis Delfino (1606–1626 Died) 
Federico Baldissera Bartolomeo Cornaro (1626–1629 Appointed Bishop of Padua) 
Luca Stella (1632–1639 Appointed Archbishop (Personal Title) of Padua) 
Marcantonio Bragadin (1639–1655 Resigned) 
Giovanni Battista Brescia (1655–1660 Died) 
Giuseppe Civran (1660–1679 Died) 
Giambattista Rubini (1684–1702 Resigned) 
Sebastiano Venieri (1702–1738 Died) 
Antonio Maria Priuli (1738–1767 Appointed Bishop of Padua)  
Marco Giuseppe Cornaro (Corner) (1767–1779 Died) 
Alvise Maria Gabrieli (1779–1785 Died) 
Marco Zaguri (1785–1810 Died) 
Giuseppe Maria Peruzzi (1818–1830 Died) 
Giovanni Giuseppe Cappellari (1832–1860 Died) 
St. Giovanni Antonio Farina (1860–1888 Died) 
Antonio Maria De Pol (1888–1892 Died) 
Antonio Feruglio (1893–1911 Resigned) 
Ferdinando Rodolfi (1911–1943 Died) 
Carlo Zinato (1943–1971 Retired) 
Arnoldo Onisto (1971–1988 Retired) 
Pietro Giacomo Nonis (1988–2003 Retired) 
Cesare Nosiglia, Archbishop (personal title) (2003–2010 Appointed Archbishop of Turin) 
Beniamino Pizziol (16 Apr 2011 – )

See also
 Timeline of Vicenza

References

Sources
  (in Latin)
 
 
 

 Diocese of Vicenza - Benigni, U. (1912). In The Catholic Encyclopedia. New York: Robert Appleton Company.

Acknowledgment

Vicenza
Vicenza